Denys Volodymyrovych Skepskyi (born 5 July 1987) is a Ukrainian footballer who plays as defensive midfielder.

Club career
Skepskyi has also represented Dynamo Moscow in the Russian Premier League, playing four times for the club in 2006 and once in 2009. In 2019 he played for Shevardeni-1906 Tbilisi After he moved to Viktoriya Mykolaivka. In summer 2022 he moved to Niva Buzova. On 23 October 2022 he scored against Rubikon Kyiv for the Ukrainian Second League.

Honours
Viktoriya Mykolaivka
 Ukrainian Football Amateur League: 2019–20
 Ukrainian Amateur Cup: Runners-up 2019–20

Desna Chernihiv
 Ukrainian First League: 2017–18

FC Metalurh Zaporizhya
 Ukrainian First League: 2011–12

References

External links

1987 births
Footballers from Chernihiv
Living people
Ukrainian footballers
Association football midfielders
FC Desna Chernihiv players
FC Dynamo-2 Kyiv players
FC Dynamo-3 Kyiv players
Ukrainian expatriate footballers
Expatriate footballers in Russia
Russian Premier League players
SDYuShOR Desna players
FC Yunist Chernihiv players
FC Dynamo Moscow players
FC Volgar Astrakhan players
FC Metalurh Zaporizhzhia players
Expatriate footballers in Belarus
FC Belshina Bobruisk players
FC Torpedo Moscow players
FC Poltava players
FC Cherkashchyna players
FC Sakhalin Yuzhno-Sakhalinsk players
MFC Mykolaiv players
FC Polissya Zhytomyr players
Expatriate footballers in Georgia (country)
Ukrainian expatriate sportspeople in Georgia (country)
FC Shevardeni-1906 Tbilisi players
FC Viktoriya Mykolaivka players
FC Nyva Buzova players
Ukraine under-21 international footballers
Ukraine youth international footballers